La heredera is a 1982 Venezuelan telenovela created by Delia Fiallo and transmitted on Venevisión. Hilda Carrero and Eduardo Serrano starred as the main protagonists. The theme song for the telenovela was Ámame by Marlene.

Plot
Cristina is a young woman who moves to the city away from her remote village searching fora  better life. Reaching the city, she meets a woman named Belinda and learns the art of puppetry. One day, while doing a show at a Children's Hospital, she meets a young doctor called  Julián Infante who is attracted by Cristina's charming personality and intelligence, but he notices that she has a limp. Julián offers to help her cure the lameness. Later, Cristina discovers she is the daughter of Exequiel Zambrano, a rich man who fell in love with her poor mother a long time ago. Before his death, Ezequiel asks his lawyer to look for his missing daughter and give her an inheritance. Cristina is found and goes to live in the Zambrano household where she meets her new family. Luisa, her aunt, and her half-sister will torment her and add to her sufferings. Cristina will also meet Alfredo Méndez, the administrator of the Zambrano fortune who will conspire with her evil aunt to steal her inheritance. But what Cristina doesn't know is that Alfredo is hiding a secret from the past and is filled with a desire for revenge against the Zambrano family

Cast
 Hilda Carrero- Cristina Zambrano   
 Eduardo Serrano - Julián Infante
 Diego Acuña 
 Gisvel Ascanio
 Estelín Betancor 
 Eva Blanco
 Marita Capote  
 Olga Castillo 
 Helianta Cruz  
 Guillermo Dávila
 Renee de Pallas
 Chela D'Gar  
 Mariluz Díaz 
 Miguel David Díaz   
 Manuel Escolano   
 Fernando Flores 
 Mauricio González 
 Dennys Hernández 
 Yolanda Méndez 
 Esther Orjuela   
 Francia Ortiz

References

External links

1982 telenovelas
Venevisión telenovelas
Venezuelan telenovelas
1982 Venezuelan television series debuts
1982 Venezuelan television series endings
Spanish-language telenovelas
Television shows set in Venezuela